The Art Nouveau movement of architecture and design appeared in Antwerp, Belgium, between roughly 1898 and the start of the First World War in 1914. It was principally practiced by the architects Joseph Bascourt, Jacques De Weerdt, Jules Hofman, Émile Van Averbeke, Émile Thielens, Frans Smet-Verhas as well as August Cols and Alfried Defever. Its principal characteristics in Antwerp buildings include whiplash lines and irregular curves in moldings, ironwork, and incised decoration; gentle arches; colorful ceramic tiles, mosaics, and stained glass; gilded asymmetrical ornament; sgraffito; and keyhole windows and screens.

The Zurenborg district 
Unlike the other major Belgian metropolitan areas such as Brussels or Liège, where Art Nouveau flourished in numerous different parts of the city, Antwerp's Art Nouveau buildings are largely concentrated within a single quarter, Zurenborg, which is a suburban part of the city located about three kilometers from the city center, immediately north of the Berchem train station. The greater part of the structures are situated in the so-called "Golden Triangle" of Antwerpian Art Nouveau, along the streets called the Transvaalstraat, Waterloostraat and Cogels Osylei. The latter, an arterial boulevard, contains a rich cornucopia of highly-ornamented, monumental Victorian- and Edwardian-era architecture, wherein various styles--neoclassical, eclectic, various Renaissance idioms, and above all Art Nouveau--intermingle harmoniously behind small gardens or gates with successive diversity.

Principal Art Nouveau buildings in Antwerp 
A few major buildings stand out among the Art Nouveau structures in Antwerp, though none have reached the kind of iconic status such as that enjoyed by Henry van de Velde's Bloemenwerf or Victor Horta's  Hôtel Tassel, Maison du Peuple, Hôtel Solvay, or Maison Van Eetvelde, all in Brussels.

Zonnebloem (Sunflower) House 
One of the most beautiful examples of Antwerp's Art Nouveau structures is the Zonnebloem House, sometimes called the Maison le Tournesol (Sunflower House), built in 1900 to designs of Jules Hofman at 50, Cogels Osylei in a strand of Art Nouveau close to the German Jugendstil. The stylized floral ornaments run along the bays that differ at each level. One can see two sunflowers on the main façade and three smaller ones on the first floor above ground just above the entrance arcade.

House of the Battle of Waterloo 
Another remarkable construction in this district is the Huis de Slag van Waterloo (House of the Battle of Waterloo), designed by the architect Frans Smet-Verhas and built in 1905. Here the nearly-symmetrical façade (broken only by a side tower) is articulated by mosaics bearing the names, figures, and standards of the Duke of Wellington and Napoleon I, along with a strange arrangement of bricks on the uppermost floor.

The Maison du Peuple ("House of the People") 
Several very interesting and original buildings were constructed in other parts of Antwerp, including the Maison du Peuple built in 1901 by the architects Emile van Averbeke and Jan van Asperen, similar in purpose and corporate structure to other Maisons du Peuple (centers of cooperative workers' assistance, usually tied to socialist parties) in Europe. The balanced façade is pierced in the center by a great oval bay is surrounded by a mosaic symbolizing labor with the slogan "Help U Zelve" (literally, "Help Yourself"). The façade is crowned by two angled pylons that terminate in sculptures in stone of a man and a woman, with each figure encircled by a spiral of wrought iron.

The House of the Five Continents 
Also notable is the House of the Five Continents ("Huis de Vijf Werelddelen"), probably the most original Art Nouveau structure in the city, nicknamed "'t Bootje" ("The Little Boat"), due to the second-floor loggia in the form of a ship's prow that emerges at the corner of the structure. It is actually a complex of four houses designed for the well-heeled shipbuilder P. Roeis, hence the ship forms and name, which also references Antwerp's longstanding stature as a global port. It is situated at the angle of Schilderstraat and Plaatsnijdersstraat and was built to designs of Frans Smet-Vehas in 1901.

List of Art Nouveau structures in Antwerp
This list includes all buildings that might be classified as Art Nouveau in a broad sense. Note that this list is not exhaustive and should be added to as need be.

Zurenborg District

Northern Zurenborg

"Golden Triangle" of Art Nouveau

Other Districts of Antwerp

References